Anil Kumar Sah (born 17 November 1998) is a Nepalese cricketer. He made his List A debut for Nepal in the 2018 ICC World Cricket League Division Two tournament on 12 February 2018. He was one of the eleven cricketers to play in Nepal's first ever One Day International (ODI) match, against the Netherlands, in August 2018.

International career
In July 2018, he was named in Nepal's squad for their One Day International (ODI) series against the Netherlands. These were Nepal's first ODI matches since gaining ODI status during the 2018 Cricket World Cup Qualifier. He made his Twenty20 debut for Nepal in the 2018 MCC Tri-Nation Series against the Marylebone Cricket Club on 29 July 2018. He made his Twenty20 International (T20I) on the same day, against the Netherlands. He made his ODI debut for Nepal against the Netherlands on 1 August 2018.

In August 2018, he was named in Nepal's squad for the 2018 Asia Cup Qualifier tournament. In October 2018, he was named in Nepal's squad in the Eastern sub-region group for the 2018–19 ICC World Twenty20 Asia Qualifier tournament.

Domestic 
In November 2022, Sah started playing for Madhesh Province Cricket Association leaving previous Nepal Police Club. He played inning of 61 runs with five fours and a six against Province No. 1 in PM Cup 2022.

References

External links
 

1998 births
Living people
Nepalese cricketers
Nepal One Day International cricketers
Nepal Twenty20 International cricketers
People from Bara District